Lady Mechanika is a steampunk comic created by comic artist Joe Benitez.

History of the series
The Lady Mechanika, a comic series in the steampunk genre, was originally planned as a six-part story. Aspen MLT agreed to produce the serial and began publishing them on an infrequent basis. The first issue of Lady Mechanika, issue #0, debuted and sold out in October, 2010. The third issue was scheduled for release December 21, 2011. At the Steamcon III convention, held October 2011 in Bellevue, Washington, Joe Benitez won the Airship Award in the Visual category for his work on the comic. Lady Mechanika's look was inspired by steampunk fashion icon Kato.

Titles in the series include: 
Lady Mechanika: The Mystery of the Mechanical Corpse (2010-2015)
Lady Mechanika: The Tablet of Destinies (2015)
Lady Mechanika: The Lost Boys of West Abbey (2016)
Lady Mechanika: La Dama de la Muerte (2017)
Lady Mechanika: The Clockwork Assassin (2018)
Lady Mechanika:  La Belle Dame Sans Merci (2019)
Lady Mechanika: Sangre (2020)
Lady Mechanika: The Monster of the Ministry of Hell (2022)

Plot

Vol. 1: Mystery of the Mechanical Corpse 

The tabloids dubbed her Lady Mechanika, the sole survivor of a psychotic serial killer's three-year rampage through London. Found locked in an abandoned laboratory amidst countless corpses and body parts, with her own limbs amputated and replaced with mechanical components, her life began anew. With no memory of her captivity or her former life, Lady Mechanika eventually built a career for herself as a private detective, using her unique abilities to solve cases the police couldn't or wouldn't handle. Still, she has never stopped searching for answers... Now, brought into a case unlike any before, Lady Mechanika will have to rely on her advantage in all things occult and paranormal in order to solve the case and possibly unlock the secrets of her past! 
Set in England at the turn of the 20th century  Lady Mechanika is an all-new supernatural action-adventure series with unique and vivid story arcs designed to allow new readers to jump right into any volume without missing a thing.

Vol. 2: The Tablet of Destinies 

A Professor of archaeology and a German scientist together discover a chamber created in Sumerian times in the middle of Africa. In it lies a mysterious Tablet, the key to infinite wealth and power. Lady Mechanika is drawn in to protect the archaeologist's granddaughter, Winifred, from would-be kidnappers intending to use her to incentivise her grandfather to work more quickly and disclose to them the secrets of the Tablet. Winifred is kidnapped in London but rescued in Germany by Lady Mechanika. Using a flying dirigible hot air balloon provided by a Rosicrucian secret society, Lady Mechanika and Winifred are over the Sahara on the way to the archaeological dig when the dirigible is attacked by a group connected to the people who meanwhile have taken forcible charge of the archaeological expedition. They pose as Germans but are in fact Serpent creatures able to assume human form. Lady Mechanika and Winifred escape the explosion of the dirigible, cross the desert with the help, first, of a slaver party and, later, of a band of female warriors, the Desert Wraiths. Eventually Akina, one of the warriors joins the two of them in finding, attacking and overcoming the Serpent group before the Serpents are able to take the Tablet, which turns out to be a nuclear weapon, to destroy Berlin. In order to rid the world of knowledge of the weapon, the escaping Lady Mechanika and friends launch the weapon from the archaeologist's dirigible into the heart of the mountain below where other weapons of the same kind are thought to be hidden. Winifred returns to London with her grandfather; the scientist goes into hiding with another identity for cover; Lady Mechanika receives a coded thank you message from the leader of the Rosicrucian group.

Vol. 3: The Lost Boys of West Abbey 
Set in West Abbey, a poor district of Mechanika City, the story begins with a young orphan boy and an attempt by his captor to trap the boy's mind in the body of a mechanical toy. Lady Mechanika's inability to recall her own origins prompt her, once the newspapers write about “secret mechanical experiments and murders,” to assist, unofficially, Detective Inspector Singh of the City police. In this she is aided by her friend, Mr Lewis. The bodies of five suffocated street urchins are found in a creepy basement mechanical workshop, each of them bearing on their foreheads blood-marks written in Hebrew. Having interviewed other urchin boys, the search is on for a man known only as “the toy man”, whose face is half covered by a scar. One of the boys has pickpocketed the toy man and taken a small Jewish relict, which is handed to the policeman. Lewis takes home to investigate it a mechanical teddy bear, which has a small compartment containing a parchment scroll with the Hebrew word for Death written on it. He pockets this parchment. Lady Mechanika and DI Singh interview a Jewish Rebbe who reveals that the relict may have been used to ward off evil spirits by someone who summoned and controls them. Lady Mechanika and Lewis interview an innocent mechanical toymaker who has supplied to order mechanical figures with small compartments in the mouth for a Mr Durrant. The figures supplied include a ten foot high clockwork man. Durrant is the wealthy but elderly and frail owner of the workshop building. Lady Mechanika, DI Singh and Mr Lewis visit Durrant in Lewis’ flying vehicle. They inspect the house, discover the toy man who confesses, but are attacked by the ten foot high man, a body now inhabited by Lord Durrant. Durrant had become obsessed with avoiding death and with creating a race of gods, using all the best minds of humanity and capturing them in mechanical creatures. The fight ends when Lady Mechanika places the Death parchment in the mouth of the ten foot high man, who shuts down. Lady Mechanika parts company with DI Singh on excellent terms. She and Lewis rush home, fearing the mechanical bear from which the parchment was taken may have “woken up” and become a threat to Winifred, Lady Mechanika's young friend. In fact, they find she has taught the bear to play the piano to a remarkable degree: it chooses to be called Mon-Ti, but it is left unanswered as to whether the bear contains the mind of the other small boy missing from the urchin group, but devoid of memories as is Lady Mechanika.

References

External links
 Aspen Comics homepage
 Lady Mechanika creator page
 Lady Mechanika page at Image Comics

2010 comics debuts
Aspen Comics titles
Steampunk comics